The 12th Negev Brigade (Hativat HaNegev) is an Israeli reserve infantry brigade under the Sinai Division, that originally served in the 1948 Arab-Israeli war.

History

Founding and organization

The brigade was founded in March 1948 with two battalions, the 2nd and 8th. The 7th Battalion was created in April, with the 9th Battalion being the last of the four. Yisrael Galili, the Haganah Chief of Staff, and Yigal Allon, the Palmach commander, chose Nachum Sarig to command the brigade in December 1947, although the residents of the Negev and David Ben-Gurion appointed Shaul Avigur instead, without Sarig's knowledge. After Avigur toured the Negev, he told Ben-Gurion that he would not be able to command the brigade, citing deteriorating health, and praised Sarig.

It was commanded by Nahum "Sergei" Sarig (which is why it was also called Sergei Brigade) and consisted of four Palmach battalions. The Negev Brigade participated in many operations in the Negev Desert, including Operation Yoav in the latter part of the war. Sarig decided to divide the Negev into two sectors, divided by the Beersheba–Gaza road (later Highway 25). Yigal Allon then named Haim Bar-Lev as the commander of the southern sector—the 8th Battalion.

The Palmach memorial website records the names of 312 of its members who died whilst in the Negev Brigade.

During the 1948 war the Negev Brigade was involved in the defence of Negba, Kafr Daron, Be'erot Yitzhak and Nirim. In October 1948 the Brigade took part in the conquest of Beersheba. They were also part of Operations Barak, Yoav, An Far, Horev, Uvda and Pleshet. In the 1967 war the Brigade fought in the battle of Abu Agelia.

Memorialization
Outside Be'er Sheva stands Dani Karavan's sculpture "Monument to the Negev Brigade".

Image gallery

References

Bibliography

1948 Arab–Israeli War
Brigades of Israel
Palmach
Military units and formations established in 1948